Carters Steam Fair (no apostrophe is used in the name) was a travelling vintage fair. Founded in 1977 by John Carter (1942–2000), this family business is now managed by the second generation of Carters.

Carters operated and maintained a large collection of vintage rides and sidestalls, ranging in date from the 1870s to the 1960s, and every season they travelled with vintage heavy lorries and traditional showmen's living wagons. The fair provided an opportunity to enjoy historic equipment and artwork.

Their operating base and restoration workshops were immediately adjacent to White Waltham Airfield, near Maidenhead, in Berkshire.

Carters  announced in October 2022 that they were ending the ‘travelling steam-fair’ and that their final tour would end at Prospect Park, Reading on 30 October 2022.

Rides and attractions

Carters Steam Fair was a travelling collection of rare working funfair rides, In April 2016, the touring rides with the Fair were:

On their last tour in August 2022, they travelled with the following rides:

Switch from cash to tokens

In 2014, Carters Steam Fair moved from taking cash payments at each attraction to a token coin system. By April 2016, there were two distinct minting productions featuring different designs. Both designs feature the representation of a Galloper ride horse on the reverse, along with the texts "Carters Steam Fair", "No cash value", and "No refund value" around the image on the coin's edge. Additionally, the text "1 Token" appears across the horse's neck horizontally in a rectangular box. All text is presented in block letters.

2014 Token Obverse
The obverse of the 2014 coin token features a representation of the comedian Harry Hill, wearing a paper Christmas cracker hat. Originally Hill was going to design an image himself for this first minting, but in the event he was also about to put on a stage show and was too busy to fit it in and so with his blessing, Carters put his portrait on the coin instead.

2015 Token Obverse
The obverse of the 2015 coin token features a representation of the late John Carter, who in 1977, along with his wife Anna, purchased the Steam Gallopers, and thus started what was to become Carters Steam Fair.

In popular culture

Models
A number of die-cast models featuring the name of and / or reproducing vehicles used by Carters Steam Fair have been produced; 
 Corgi Toys released a limited edition Morris 1000 in 1995 as part of their Corgi Classics range, named "Advanced Publicity Van Set: Carters Steam Fair", in 1:43 scale. 14,300 were produced and distributed worldwide. This model came with a ‘Seafood Stall Kit’.
 Oxford Diecast released a Morris J San Remo Ice Cream Van during 2014, registration "WLD 759", based on the Carters full-size vehicle, and in 1:76 scale.

Television
 Antiques Roadshow, Series 29, Episode 2 (BBC, 2006)
 Fairground Attractions (Channel 5 Broadcasting Ltd, 2014)
 Midsomer Murders (ITV, 2015)
 Great British Railway Journeys, Series 7, Episode 20
Wurzal Gummidge, BBC Series, 2019

Film

The Fair has been featured in many films including;
 Hugo
 The Krays
 28 Days Later
 The End of the Affair
 28 Weeks Later
 The Theory of Everything
 Paddington 2
 Rocketman

Music 
The Kaiser Chiefs' Meanwhile Up in Heaven music video was filmed on the fair in 2014.

See also
 List of steam fairs
 Showman
 Travelling funfair
 Musée des Arts Forains (The Funfair Museum), in Paris, France

Further reading 
Bartrip, P.W.J., The state and the steam boiler in Britain International review of social history 25, 1980, 77–105, Government intervention and the role of interest groups in 19th Century Britain in regard to stationary boilers.

David Whyley Austin automobiles, 1998, Volume looks at Austin children's pedal cars of the 1950s, including the Pathfinder racing model, illustrated with manufacturer's photographs.

Adrian G. Shaw with Anna Carter, A season with Carters Steam Fair, words by Anna Carter, soft-cover book of black and white photography by Adrian G Shaw, documenting a season on the road with Carters Steam Fair, 60 pages, paperback, illustrated throughout.

Paul Braithwaite, Arcades and slot machines: with an A-Z of British manufacturers, 1870–1970; edited by John Carter; photography by Brian Steptoe., White Waltham:Carters Books 1997, Lists known makers between 1870 and 1970 and describes particular models, features photographs from Carters Steam Fair's arcade machine collection, 105 pages, paperback, illustrated throughout.

Paul Braithwaite, John Carter's Jubilee Steam Gallopers: a souvenir of one hundred years of riding for pleasure!, With John Carter. The story of Carters Jubilee Steam Gallopers, from manufacture to the present day, including detailed information and illustrations of its restoration and history, Maidenhead:J. Carter and Sons, 1995, 64 pages, paperback, illustrated throughout, ISBN (pbk.) BNB GB9589409.

Paul Braithwaite, Swings, Park Swings, Overboats and Over The Tops, Edited by John Carter. Covers the style and manufacture of these types of fairground rides, Maidenhead:J. Carter and Sons, 1996, 28 pages, paperback, illustrated throughout, ISBN (pbk.) BNB GBA336684.

Kevin Scrivens, Carters Jungle Thriller: The lost ark / compiled by Kevin Scrivens and Stephen Smith, The story of Carters Jungle Thriller Ark, illustrated with clear photographs of the restoration process and the build-up of the ride, Maidenhead: Carters Books, 2006, 37 pages, paperback, illustrated throughout, ISBN (pbk.) BNB GBA907362

Anna Carter, Carters: No 1 For Family Fun, Introducing Carters Steam Fair, from its history to its rides. 40 pages, paperback, illustrated throughout.

John Carter and Anna Carter, Putting fun back into funfair, Maidenhead: Carters Steam Fair, 1994?

References

External links 

 Carters Steam Fair official website
 Joby Carter's official website
 Signwriting courses by Joby Carter
 [Reader's Digest] Article on Carters Steam Fair
 [BBC] Article on Carters Steam Fair and the term "freak" 27 September 2005
 [BBC] Incredible skill of old-fashioned fairground signwriter (BBC 17 July 2013) – featuring the work of Joby Carter as a signwriter.
 The Society of Independent Roundabout Proprietors Official website
 National Fairground Archive page for Fairground Art
 Entertainment of Yesteryear website page for Chair-o-Plane ride

External links – Video
 [YouTube] Video: Carters Steam Fair YouTube Channel
 [YouTube] Video of Carters Steam Fair @ Alton Towers Feb 2007
 [YouTube] Video: White knuckle Chair-o-Planes
 [YouTube] Video of a Chair-O-Plane Ride (Ground View)
 [YouTube] Video: Restoring the Lightning Skid – Behind the Scenes at Carters Yard

Fairs in England
1977 establishments in England
2022 disestablishments in England
Steam festivals